The New Zealand Game Developers Association (NZGDA) was founded in 2001.  It was formed to support the video game development industry in New Zealand.

The primary mission of the NZGDA is to build the New Zealand video game development industry into a preferred supplier of related products and services.  It also facilitates communication for New Zealand game developers, and aims to create quality development, and business capabilities within New Zealand.  The NZGDA coordinates monthly Game Developer Meetups in Auckland, Wellington, Christchurch and Dunedin. It also runs the annual New Zealand Game Developers Conference and Kiwi Game Starter startup challenge.

The Association says that New Zealand game developers earned $323.9 million in the year to 1 April 2020, of which 96% came from international audiences.

NZGDA members can be either studios or individuals making PC, console, mobile, web, VR/AR, educational, serious and even board games. The Chairperson of the organisation for 2021 is Chelsea Rapp, a game developer in Christchurch, New Zealand.

Members

References

External links
 New Zealand Game Developers Association Website
 Auckland Game Developers Meetup
 Game Developers of Wellington
 NZGDA & IGDANZ Facebook Group
Business organisations based in New Zealand